Professor Peter Edgar Corbett (19 June 1920 – 31 August 1992), was a British art historian and classical scholar.

Biography

Born in Preston, Hertfordshire on 19 June 1920, Peter Corbett was educated at Bedford School and at St John's College, Oxford.  He was Thomas Whitcombe Greene Scholar and Macmillan Student in the British School at Athens between 1947 and 1949, Assistant Keeper in the Department of Greek and Roman Antiquities at the British Museum between 1949 and 1961, Yates Professor of Classical Art and Archaeology at University College London between 1961 and 1982, and President of the Society for the Promotion of Hellenic Studies between 1980 and 1983.

Professor Peter Corbett died in London on 31 August 1992, aged 72.

Publications

The Sculpture of the Parthenon, 1959
Greek Gods and Heroes, 1974
Articles in the Journal of Hellenic Studies, Hesperia, The Annual of the British School at Athens, British Museum Quarterly, and the Bulletin of the Institute of Classical Studies

References

1920 births
1992 deaths
People educated at Bedford School
Alumni of St John's College, Oxford
Classical scholars of the University of London
English classical scholars
Employees of the British Museum
English art historians
Academics of University College London
Royal Air Force personnel of World War II
20th-century English historians
English male non-fiction writers
20th-century English male writers